Antonio Escobar Núñez (born 1976) is a Spanish musical artist who has won awards during his career as a music producer, mixing engineer, sound designer and composer for advertising, film, TV and recording artists. Escobar's music features rock, electronica, pop, dance, urban, Latin and orchestral influences.

Biography

Background

Antonio Escobar was born in Pamplona, Navarre, Spain, raised in Málaga and is of Andalusian descent. He began during the late 1990s as a studio engineer and music producer for the Spanish singer Manzanita and in 1998, formed Spanish the award-winning indie band Maydrïm.

Productions

Escobar was one of the first music producers in Spain to merge rock, electronica, pop and orchestral in the late 1990s and he has been very connected with the last trends in music.

He has worked composing, arranging and producing for a series of recording artists and music groups including John Legend's A Place Called World, Zara Larsson's Invisible (Klaus movie version), Dan Croll, Carlos Rivera, Malú, Dvicio, Nena Daconte, Manzanita, Vanesa Martín, Carlos Baute, OBK, Anni B Seet, Carles Benavent, Carlos Tarque (M-Clan), Dani Reus & The Gospel Factory, De Pedro, Dr Kucho!, Garrett Wall, José Ortega, La Mari (Chambao), Salvador Beltrán, Lolita Flores, Lonely Joe (as "Alan May"), Lucas, Luis Ramiro, Marwan, Vanexxa and Zahara. He has worked with many important music companies including Columbia, EMI, Sony Music, Universal Music, Warner Music, Vale Music, Subterfuge, El Diablo, Lunar and Weekend.

Sonic branding

In 2000, Escobar was a mixing engineer and technician for live programmes at Localia Málaga, Málaga, a former television channel of the Prisa Media Group. In 2002, he moved to Madrid to become chief producer, composer and mixer for the advertising division of A.S.K., a music production company owned by the Argentinian rock producer Alejandro Stivel and one of Spain’s top 5 music production studios at that time. Escobar established the production company and record label, Antipop, to maximize his music productivity within the advertising industry, generate soundtracks for film and television, and produce music for more recording artists.

Advertising campaigns

Escobar has composed and produced music for television, cinema and commercials, including idents, and has worked on over 200 publicity campaigns on behalf of advertising agencies and media channels for Europe and USA. He has created music for the promotion of Spanish brands, including Adif, Aena, Sammontana and Caja Madrid, and has recorded with the Bratislava Symphony Orchestra and the La Orquesta de Cámara Andrés Segovia.

Escobar has also created advertising scores for international brands, including Audi, B.M.W., Carlsberg, Carrefour (broadcast in 34 countries), Coca-Cola, Ford, Nestlé, Orange, Pepsi, Peugeot, Procter & Gamble, Renault, Santander, Sony PlayStation, Telefónica, Turismo España and Visa (worldwide campaign). The commercials have been broadcast in Spain (Iberia (on Antena 3), Canal Plus, Telecinco, Televisión Española, Corporación Radiotelevisión Española, Cuatro and laSexta), as well as internationally (Europe, Asia and South America).

Awards

In recognition of his music-to-picture talents, Escobar has won various industry awards for his contributions to the sonic and visual arts. These include a Oscars Academy Awards and Cannes Film Festival nominations,  BAFTA, Gold award for Best Music at the New York Film Festival, Goya Awards, Las Vegas International Film Awards, to name a few.

Rock launch

In 2003, Escobar joined forces with the singer Noemí Carrión to form the pop-rock group Nómadas and in 2004, Nieva meaning Snows, whose musical sound fuses electric guitars with electronica. In 2007, after three years of development, the duo performed concerts in Spanish cities with a full band before writing, recording and producing their debut album. In 2011, the group began the final mixing and mastering of Sed De Mar (Sea Of Thirst). Also in 2011, Escobar was the programmer of Hacia Lo Salvaje, the sixth studio album of award-winning Spanish rock group Amaral.

Later activities

Escobar's latest soundtracks credits include Klaus, Reyes de la Noche, El Cid, Santiago Of The Seas, Alex´s Strip. He has also participated in singles for the band Dvicio ( "Soy de volar")

Awards, prizes, nominations (outdated)

Film and TV - individual (outdated)
 2009 Best Soundtrack, “Miente”, III Festival Digital El Sector, Spain
 2008 Best Soundtrack (Roel Mejor Música), “Miente”, 21st Medina del Campo Festival, Spain
 2008 Best Soundtrack, “Miente”, III Corto Festival “Dunas” de Cine y Video, Spain
 2006 Silver, R.T.V.E. “Comunícate”, New York Film Festival, US
 2005 Best Music, “Buenos Compañeros”, X Festival U.E.M. Cortometrajes, Spain

Music - individual (outdated)
 2007 Best Song, Maydrïm “Lighthouse”, II Electronic Music Contest Caja España, Spain
 2003 Best Trip Hop Theme, Maydrïm "Inside", Hispasonic, Spain
 2001 Best Song, Maydrïm “Drink My Eyes”, International Shock Millennium, Spain
 2000 Best Band, Maydrïm, Muestra de Música Joven Ciudad de Málaga, Spain

Advertising - individual (outdated)
 2004 Mejor Música (Silver), Carlsberg "Kulu Ngile", Premios Drac, Spain
 2004 Best Sound, Coca-Cola “Musical”, Premios A.P.P.E. (Asociación de Productoras Publicitarias Españolas), Spain
 2003 Best Music (Gold), Coca-Cola “Musical”, New York Film Festival, US

Film & TV - collective (outdated)
 2020 Nomination Best Animation Film, Klaus (film), The Oscars Awards, US
2020 Best Animation Film, Klaus (film), BAFTA Awards, UK
2009 Best Short Film, “Miente”, III Festival Digital El Sector, Spain
 2009 Best Script, “Impávido”, I Concurso Nacional de Proyectos Cinematográficos "Ciudad de Gijón", Spain
 2009 Best Short Film, “Miente”, Awarded by Academia de las Artes Cinematográficas de España, XXIII Premios Goya (Mejor Cortometraje), Spain
 2008 Best Short Film, “Miente”, III Corto Festival “Dunas” de Cine y Video, Spain
 2008 Premio Al Mejor Cortometraje Temática De Igualdad, "Miente", VI Certamen de cortometrajes de Écija Thánatos, Spain
 2008 Best Short Film (Roel de Oro) and Best Director (Roel), “Miente”, 21st Medina del Campo Festival, Spain
 2008 Biznaga De Plata, “Miente”, 11º Festival de Málaga, Spain
 2007 Best Short Film, “Impávido”, Fant-cortada, Spain
 2007 Best Short Film, “Impávido”, Festival de cortometrajes Cortogenia, Spain
 2005 Best Music, “Buenos Compañeros”, Universidad Europe de Madrid, Spain

Advertising – collective (outdated)
 2006 Gold, Metro de Madrid “Transparente”, New York Film Festival, US
 2005 Sol De Plata, Metro de Madrid “Transparente”, El Sol 2005 (San Sebastián), Spain
 2005 Sol De Bronce, Cowboy “Dodot Etapas”, El Sol 2005 (San Sebastián), Spain
 2005 Best Advert, Coca-Cola “Del Pita”, Premios “El Chupete”, Spain
 2005 Best Integrated Marketing Program, Coca-Cola “Del Pita”, Marketing Excellence Awards (TCCC), UK
 2005 Gold, Coca-Cola “Del Pita”, “Premios A.M.P.E. 2005, Spain
 2005 Bronze, Coca-Cola “Del Pita”, New York Film Festival, US
 2004 Gold, Coca-Cola “Del Pita”, Premios A.P.P.E. (Asociación de Productoras Publicitarias Españolas), Spain
 2004 Finalist, Coca-Cola “Musical”, Premios El Sol B, Spain
 2004 Finalist, Coca-Cola “Musical”, Cannes Lions, France
 2004 Finalist, Coca-Cola “Musical”, London International Awards, UK
 2003 Finalist, Coca-Cola “Musical”, Premios Zapping, Spain
 2003 Best Advert, Coca-Cola “Musical”, TP de Oro, Spain

Advertising music

International brands

Audi, Banco Bilbao Vizcaya Argentaria, B.M.W., Bongrain SA, Carlsberg, Carrefour, Coca-Cola, Ford, Girlguiding UK, I.B.M., IKEA, Illva Saronno, Movistar, Nestlé, Orange, Pepsi, Peugeot, Procter & Gamble, Renault, Sammontana, Santander, Sony PlayStation, Ssang Yong, Sunny Delight, Telefónica, Turismo España, Turismo Madrid, Visa

Spanish brands

Asociación Nacional para el desarrollo de la Salud en la Mujer, Adif, Aena, Amena, Antena Tres, Aviva, Barceló, Caballero, Caja Madrid, Canal Plus, Castilla La Mancha, Cerveza Mixta, Comité Olímpico Español, Comunidad de Madrid, Cuatro, El Corte Inglés, Endesa, Ferrovial, Flex, Fuerzas Armadas de España, Fundación Irene Megías, Hipotecas.Com, Jazztel, Kalise, Larios laSexta, Metro Madrid, Ministerio de Trabajo e Inmigración de España, MultiÓpticas, Once, Mútua Madrileña, Orlando, Páginas Amarillas, Real Club Celta de Vigo, RTVE, Santa Lucía, Telecinco, Televisión Española, Tesoro Público

Film music 
IMDB
2021 El rey de todo el mundo
2021 Reyes de la noche
2020 El Cid
2020 Santiago Of The Seas
2020 Relatos con-fi-na-dos
2020 La cinta de Alex
2019 Klaus
2019 Qué te juegas
2019 Qin ai de xin nian hao
2019 ¿Qué te juegas?
2019 #Abro Hilo
2018 La teoría del sueño
2018 El árbol de la sangre
2018 Perdida
2018 "Serás hombre", Director: Isabel de Ocampo
2018 Black Panther
2018 No dormirás
2017 Talismán
2017 Sólo se vive una vez
2017 "Toc Toc", Director: Vicente Villanueva, Lazona
2016 Mascotas
2016 Money
2015 All Roads Lead To Rome
2014 Gurba
2014 O21
2013 Al otro lado de la puerta
2013 Jaisalmer
2012 Atocha 70
2012 "Evelyn", Director: Isabel de Ocampo, La Voz Que Yo Amo
2012 “Looking For Eimish” (Buscando an Eimish), Director: Ana Rodriguez, Jana Films.
 2012 “Impávido”, Director: Carlos Therón, Enigma Films.
2012 Sssh!
2011 La raya que me raya

 2011 "Háztelo Mirar", TV series, Directors: Víctor Martín León & David Velduque, Antena 3 Neox.
 2010 “The Vampire In The Hole”, Director: Sonia Escolano & Sadrac González, LaSoga/Lukantum.
 2006 “La Máquina De Bailar”, Director: Óscar de Aibar, Amiguetes Entertainment/Ensueño Films/Chapuzas Audiovisuales.

 2010 "The Recipient", Director: Javier Bermúdez, Fanatico Films.
2010 "Desalmados", TV series (online), Director: Víctor Martín León, Antena 3.
 2009 "18RDC (Ritmo De la Calle)", Videomedia, TV series, Executive Producers: Cristina Castilla & Eva Sánchez, Antena 3.
 2009 “Terapia”, Director: Nuria Verde (Premios Goya Award Nominee for Best Fictional Short Film 2010).
 2009 "Sea Bed", Director: Laura M. Campos, Antipop Films.
 2008 “Madrid 2016”, Comunidad de Madrid.
 2008 “¡Al Cielo Con Ella!”, Director: Nicolás Pacheco, La Tapia Producciones/Secuencia Imagen y Comunicación.
 2008 “Estrella”, Director: Belén Herrera de la Osa.
 2008 “Miente”, Produccíones Líquídas, Director: Isabel de Ocampo, Mandil.
 2007 “Impávido”, Mandríl, Starring Marta Torné, Director: Carlos Therón, Producciones Líquidas.
 2007 "Never Ending", Director: Laura M. Campos, Antipop Films.
 2005 "Good Partners" (Buenos compañeros), Director: Miguel de Priego.
 2005 “Mrs Eriksson In Spain" (La señora Eriksson en España) (Audio Mixing), Director: Carita Boronska, Tonetailor Productions.

Recordings (outdated)

Albums

 2011 Nieva "Sed Del Mar" (pending)
 2010 Niño Raro “Treinta y Tres”
 2009 Maydrïm “Makeyourselfagain”
 2009 Lucas "Palo Al Agua" (EMI España)
 2008 Lonely Joe “Un Toque De Lonely” (Subterfuge Records)
 2006 Vanexxa “Se Rompe O Se Raja” (Subterfuge Records)
 2005 Lonely Joe “Songs From The Low Side” (Subterfuge Records)
 2004 Gladston Galliza “Tocca Essa Bola” (Carlsberg)
 2003 Lonely Joe “Dark Ghost Of Shame” (Junk Records)
 2001 Maydrïm "#Interactive"
 2001 José Ortega "La Rosa De Tu Piel"

Singles
 2011 Maydrïm featuring Sara Montgomery-Campbell "Never Ending" (pending)
 2010 Maydrïm featuring Sara Montgomery-Campbell "Something" (Pop Up Música) 
 2008 Lucas "Éste Corazón" (EMI España)
 2006 Cycle "Mechanical"
 2005 Mar "A Que No Me Callo" (EMI España)
 2005 Maydrïm featuring Monica Castell "Killing Moon" (Lunar Records)
 2005 Maydrïm featuring Carita Boronska "Shakespeare’s Sister" (El Diablo)
 2005 Nómadas "Creer En Mí" (Vale Music)

Remixes

 2010 Compulsion "Monsters" (Maydrïm Remix)
 2009 Munich 72 "Cuando Dices Que No" (Maydrïm Remix)
 2006 In Strict Confidence "Promised Land" (Maydrïm Remix) on In Strict Confidence "The Serpent's Kiss" (Minuswelt Musikfabrik)
 2000 Digital 21 "Anymore" (Maydrïm Remix)
 1997 In The Dark "Number One" (Maydrïm Remix)

Featured songs

 2008 Luis Ramiro "Estrella" on "Estrella" film soundtrack
 2008 Marwan “El Próximo Verano" on Marwan “Trapecista” album
 2005 Maydrïm featuring Monica Castell "Killing Moon" on Various Artistes "Play the Game: Tributo a Echo and the Bunnymen" (Lunar Records)
 2005 Maydrïm featuring Carita Boronska "Shakespeare's Sister" on Various Artistes "Una luz que nunca se apagará: Tributo a The Smiths" (El Diablo)

Session recordings

 2011 Amaral "Hacia Lo Salvaje" album (Antártida)
 2010 La Mari (Chambao) on Niño Raro “Treinta y Tres” album
 2009 OBK "Tal Vez" [Antipop Version]
 2009 Zahara on Lucas "Palo Al Agua" album (EMI España)
 2005 Danny Reus & The Gospel Factory on Lonely Joe “Songs From The Low Side” album (Subterfuge Records)
 2002-4 Carita Boronska, advertising campaigns
 2001 Naymi, debut album (Sony Music Media)
 2001 Carles Benavent on José Ortega "La Rosa De Tu Piel" album

See also
 Superbrands
 Rock Español

References

External links
 
 Maydrïm Maydrim Official Site

1976 births
Living people
People from Pamplona
Musicians from Madrid
Musicians from Andalusia
Rock en Español musicians
Spanish composers
Spanish male composers
Spanish film score composers
Male film score composers
People of Andalusian descent